Christopher Pyne may refer to:
Christopher Pyne (born 1967), Australian politician
Chris Pyne (1939–1995), English jazz trombonist

See also
Chris Pine (born 1980), American actor